Tameside Metropolitan Borough Council is the local authority of the Metropolitan Borough of Tameside in Greater Manchester, England. It is a metropolitan district council, one of ten in Greater Manchester and one of 36 in the metropolitan counties of England, and provides the majority of local government services in Tameside.

The council was documented in the 2014 BBC TV series Call the Council, which showed its workers carrying out their duties.

Parliamentary representation
Tameside is currently covered by three constituencies: Ashton-under-Lyne (six wards), Denton and Reddish (five wards) and Stalybridge and Hyde (eight wards).

Wards and councillors 

Each ward is represented by three councillors.

Arms

References

External links

Metropolitan district councils of England
Local authorities in Greater Manchester
Leader and cabinet executives
Local education authorities in England
Billing authorities in England
1974 establishments in England
Tameside